Inyal (stylized INYAL) is a Scottish folktronica band. It was founded in 2016 in Glasgow.

History 
The band formed in early 2016 in Glasgow, Scotland. In 2017, it was nominated for "best up and coming artist" at the Scots Trad Music Awards. By 2019, the band had completed a tour of Australia as well as numerous concerts in Scotland.

Musical style 
Reviewing Inyal's debut album for The National, Jonny Jobson highlighted the band's Glasgow roots, writing that "the city’s musical spirit runs through the album like an artery". He noted that it was "peppered with soaring soundscapes that help give it an almost cinematic feel" and that it confidently blended elements of Scottish traditional music, electronica, and hip-hop. Alex Monaghan wrote for FolkWorld that the band "seem to focus on a dance club sound, strong beats and softer melodies, lots of alien noises and distortion without the harshness of metal music".

Band members 
Robbie Greig – fiddle
Hamish Macleod – electronics, keyboards, guitar
Conal McDonagh – uilleann pipes, whistle
Owen Sinclair – drums, percussion
Josie Duncan – vocals

Discography 
 INYAL (2018)

References

External links 
 

Scottish folk music groups
Folktronica musicians
Musical groups established in 2016
Musical quintets
2016 establishments in Scotland